Martin Disler (1 March 1949, Seewen – 27 August 1996, Geneva) was a Swiss painter, draughtsman and writer. He is associated with the Neue Wilde painting style.

Born to a family of gardeners, he was expelled from school in 1968 for disciplinary reasons. He was married to fellow artists Agnes Barmettler and later Irene Grundel. In the 1970s and 1980s, Disler worked extensively in Europe and in the US, gaining international attention alongside artists such as Sandro Chia, Francesco Clemente and Georg Baselitz. In 1982, he exhibited works at the Documenta 7. His awards include the Bremer Kunstpreis (1985), the Preis für junge Schweizer Kunst der Zürcher Kunstgesellschaft (1987) and the Kunstpreis des Kantons Solothurn (1988).

External links

 martin-disler.ch, artist information

1949 births
1996 deaths
Swiss contemporary artists
Neo-expressionist artists